The royal dottyback (Pictichromis paccagnellorum), also called the bicolor dottyback, Gramma Dotty, false gramma is a fish commonly kept in marine aquariums.  The front of the fish is bright purple and the posterior is yellow. In an aquarium, it will grow up to three inches long.  The dottyback will defend its territory against fish several times its size, but gets along with many other common aquarium fish. This is sometimes mistaken for a royal gramma.

The specific name honours the Paccagnella family of Bologna who were wholesalers of aquarium fish and who gave the type to the author, Herbert R. Axelrod.

It can grow up to 6 cm in length.

References

Gill, A. C. 2004 (3 June) Revision of the Indo-Pacific dottyback fish subfamily Pseudochrominae (Perciformes: Pseudochromidae). Smithiana Monographs No. 1: 1–213, Pls. 1-12.

External links
 

Fishkeeping
paccagnellae
Fish described in 1973